Bár is a Hungarian version of the Swedish reality The Bar. The show was aired on Viasat 3 in 2001 (season 1) and 2008 (season 2).

Season 1
Start Date: 12 May 2001
End Date: 21 July 2001
Duration: 71 days.
Presenter: Péter Novák
Contestants:
The Finalists: Tiger (The Winner) & Tibi (Runner-up).
Evicted Contestants: Attila, Edina, Erika, Évi, Laura, Napsugár, Tommi, Zoli & Zsanzi.

Contestants

Season 2
Name: Bár 2.0
Start Date: 15 September 2008
End Date: 26 October 2008
Duration: 42 days.
Presenters: Péter Majoros & Lia Kustánczi
Contestants:
The Finalists: Duda (The Winner), Évi (Runner-up), Tomi (3rd) & Zsófi (4th).
Evicted Contestants: Ági, Baba, Escobar, Péter, Ricsi & Vivi.
Ejected Contestants: Iván.

Contestants

Nominations

References

Hungarian reality television series
2000 Hungarian television series debuts
2008 Hungarian television series endings
Hungarian-language television shows
Viasat 3 original programming